Miika Juntunen (born 9 October 1964) is a retired Finnish football midfielder.

References 

1964 births
Living people
Finnish footballers
Oulun Palloseura players
Koparit players
Kemi City F.C. players
Örgryte IS players
Ilves players
Tampereen Pallo-Veikot players
FC Jazz players
AC Oulu players
Association football midfielders
Finnish expatriate footballers
Expatriate footballers in Sweden
Finnish expatriate sportspeople in Sweden
Veikkausliiga players
Allsvenskan players
People from Kemi
Sportspeople from Lapland (Finland)